The following article is a list of all Notts County Football Club seasons from 1877–78 up to 2020–21. The list details the club's achievements in all national and European first team competitions, and records their top goalscorer, for each completed season.

Seasons

Key

Key to league record:
 P = Played
 W = Games won
 D = Games drawn
 L = Games lost
 F = Goals for
 A = Goals against
 Pts = Points
 Pos = Final position
 DNE = League did not exist

Key to divisions:
 FL = Football League
 Div 1 = Football League First Division
 Div 2 = Football League Second Division
 Div 3S = Football League Third Division South
 Div 3 = Football League Third Division
 Div 4 = Football League Fourth Division
 Lge 1 = Football League One
 Lge 2 = Football League Two
 NL = National League
 n/a = Not applicable

Key to rounds:
 QR = Qualifying round
 GS = Group stage
 R1 = Round 1
 R2 = Round 2
 R3 = Round 3
 R4 = Round 4
 R5 = Round 5

 QF = Quarter-finals
 SF = Semi-finals
 ASF = Area semi-finals
 AF = Area final
 RU = Runners-up
 WS = Shared
 W = Winners

Divisions in bold indicate a change in division.

Footnotes

Ups and downs
With a total of 13 promotions and 17 relegations, no club has moved between the divisions of the Football League on more occasions than Notts County,

Promotion  year –
1897
1914
1923
1931
1950
1960
1971
1973
1981
1990
1991
1998
2010

Relegation  year –
1893
1913
1920
1926
1930
1935
1958
1959
1964
1984
1985
1992
1995
1997
2004
2015
2019

References

Sources
 
 
 The Official History Notts County. Tony Brown 1996 
 The Magpies. Tony Warsop 1984 
 Notts County FC And The Birth Of Modern Football Darrin Foss 2013 

Notts County
Seasons